50 metres, or 50-meter dash, is a sprint event in track and field. It is a relatively uncommon non-championship event for indoor track and field, normally dominated by the best outdoor 100 metres runners.  At outdoor athletics competitions it is used in the Special Olympics and a rare distance, at least for senior athletes. It is an alternative to the 60 metres running event. The imperial distance for 50 metres is 54.68 yards.

Records and personal bests in the 50 metres are frequently achieved in February and March as these dates coincide with the indoor athletics season.

All-time top 25
Indoor results only

+ = en route to a longer distance

A = affected by altitude

Men
Updated 30 November 2018.

Ben Johnson of Canada ran 5.55 at Ottawa, Canada on 31 January 1987, but this time was rescinded after Johnson admitted to using steroids between 1981 and 1988.

Notes
Below is a list of other times equal or superior to 5.63:
Maurice Greene also ran 5.59 (1999).
Michael Green also ran 5.62 (1997).
Donovan Bailey also ran 5.62 (1996).
Deji Aliu also ran 5.63 (1999).
Freddy Mayola also ran 5.63 (2001).

Outdoor best performances

+ = en route to 100m mark.
N.B. The Seville marks listed are excluding the athlete's reaction times. Bolt's & Su's times are inclusive.

Women
Correct as of January 2017.

Note: Angella Issajenko of Canada ran a world record 6.06 in Ottawa on 13 January 1987, this performance was rescinded after Issajenko's admittance of long term drug use at the Dubin Inquiry in 1989.

Notes
Below is a list of other times equal or superior to 6.11:

Irina Privalova also ran 6.01 (1994), 6.03 (1994), 6.04 (1993), 6.05 (1993, 1997), 6.07 (1994), 6.08 (1994), 6.08 (1997), 6.09 (1994) and 6.11 (1996).
Gail Devers also ran 6.03 (1999) and 6.10 (1993).
Merlene Ottey also ran 6.06 (1999), 6.08 (1999) and 6.11 (1996).
Savatheda Fynes also ran 6.07 (1999).
Philomena Mensah also ran 6.07 (1999).
Christy Opara-Thompson also ran 6.11 (1997).

Outdoor best performances
+ = en route to 100m mark

Season's bests

Men

Women

References

Events in track and field
Sprint (running)
Indoor track and field
Metres